Meilan railway station is a railway station on the Hainan eastern ring high-speed railway located in Hainan, People's Republic of China. It is connected to the Haikou Meilan International Airport, which is the main airport of the Hainan island, and one of the busiest in China. Hence, travellers typically land in the Haikou Meilan International Airport, and then reach their final destination on the Hainan island using the railway.

See also
 Haikou Meilan International Airport

External links

photo of station interior

Railway stations in Hainan
Airport railway stations in China